Packington Hall is a 17th-century mansion situated at Great Packington, near Meriden, Warwickshire, England the seat of the Earl of Aylesford. It is a Grade II* listed building.

History
It was built in 1693 for Sir Clement Fisher on whose death in 1729 the Packington estate passed to his daughter Mary, who married Heneage Finch, 2nd Earl of Aylesford.

The Park was designed by Capability Brown.

In 1772, the house was much extended and improved in Palladian style to designs by architect Joseph Bonomi.

It was severely damaged by fire in 1979 but has since been fully restored.

The house is not generally open to the public but is available by arrangement for conferences and functions.

An earlier manor house (Packington Old Hall) and an 18th-century parish church St James' Church, Great Packington stand on the estate.

Sources
    A History of the County of Warwick, Volume 4 (1947) from British History Online

References

External links 
Photos of Packington Hall and surrounding area on geograph

Grade II* listed buildings in Warwickshire
Country houses in Warwickshire
Grade II* listed houses
Gardens by Capability Brown